Clout may refer to:

Music
 Clout (band), a South African rock group
 Clout (album), 2006, by Noah23
 "Clout" (Offset song)
 "Clout", a song by Ty Dolla Sign from the 2018 album Beach House 3

Other uses
 Clout (nail), used for attaching sheet material to wooden frames
 Clout (radio show), United States
 Clout archery, in which arrows are shot at a distant flag
 Market clout
 Power (social and political)

See also 
 Klout, a website measuring social influence